Charles Albert Benbow (1870 – 29 March 1912) was a cricketer who played first-class cricket for Wellington in New Zealand from 1891 to 1897.

Life and career
Charles Benbow was born in England and migrated with his family in the 1870s to New Zealand, where his father was the manager of South British Insurance in Wellington. He attended Wellington College, then joined the AMP Society.
 
He married Alice Birch in 1902, and in 1905 they moved to New Plymouth, where he managed the new branch of the AMP Society. He and his wife had a daughter and a son. He died of pneumonia in New Plymouth on 29 March 1912 after a period of ill-health. His funeral on 31 March was the largest in New Plymouth for some years.

Cricket career
In his first first-class match Benbow was Wellington's most successful bowler in their one-wicket victory over Nelson, taking 3 for 35 and 4 for 31. His best first-class figures were 4 for 9 (off 12 overs) against Fiji in 1894–95.

References

External links
 
 

1870 births
1912 deaths
People educated at Wellington College (New Zealand)
New Zealand cricketers
Wellington cricketers
People from Solihull 
New Zealand businesspeople